Guilin Park is an interchange station between Line 12 and Line 15 on the Shanghai Metro and opened on 19 December 2015. It became an interchange station between Line 12 and Line 15 with the opening of the latter line on 23 January 2021.

Station Layout

Gallery

References

Railway stations in Shanghai
Line 12, Shanghai Metro
Line 15, Shanghai Metro
Shanghai Metro stations in Xuhui District
Railway stations in China opened in 2015